A list of the films produced in Mexico in 1987 (see 1987 in film):

1987

External links

1987
Films
Lists of 1987 films by country or language